"Taste the Feeling" is a song by Swedish DJ Avicii and Australian singer Conrad Sewell. The song was released as a digital download in March 2016, in promotion of Coca-Cola's "Taste the Feeling" campaign, and Coke's UEFA Euro 2016 and 2016 Summer Olympics campaigns.

Composition
Avicii said in a statement; "It means a lot to be involved in this project. When Coca-Cola approached me about making their anthem for the UEFA Euro 2016 campaign I could tell that it was going to be a really fun and a creative way to make a track that would connect with one of the biggest football events in the world". Sewell said; "Working with Avicii was great. He's a genuine lad and incredibly talented. I've always been a fan of his production. Being able to spend time with him at his studio in Sweden was great, because it gave us an opportunity to really vibe and get to know each other. We had a chance to dig in and make the song a great balance of both of our musical signatures, and feel like we created something that we are both proud of and can stand alone as a great piece of music, hopefully even a hit!"

Critical reception
Robbie Daw of Idolator wrote; "'Taste The Feeling' finds Aussie vocalist Sewell crooning about standing on the shore but yearning to 'grab another Coke' and take a dive. It's basically the same type of harmless, feel-good pop track Chris Brown whipped together in 2008 for Wrigley's, with Doublemint smash 'Forever,' except this one doesn't quite have the lasting, um, flavor 'Forever' did."

John Cameron of We Got This Covered wrote; "Just when you thought Avicii couldn't get any Avicii-er, the Swedish superstar DJ/producer has managed to discard any semblance of street cred he might still have had. As part of an ad campaign with Coca-Cola, he teamed up with vocalist Conrad Sewell on 'Taste The Feeling,' which has to be the most repulsively generic piece of music on which either artist will ever put their name."

Track listing

Credits and personnel
 Producers – Avicii
 Lyrics – Conrad Sewell
 Label – Avicii Music / Universal Music / 300

Charts

Versions
On May 18, 2016 Luan Santana released a version of the song. The music video was recorded in São Paulo, directed by Pedro Sokol and Fabiano Pierri, with production by Dudu Borges and also featured touches by Luan Santana himself, who attributed elements to the composition.

On July 29, 2016, the group NCT 127 released the Korean version of the song for the project Station in collaboration with Coca-Cola.

On September 14, 2016 a new version of the song featuring Spanish singer Edurne appeared advertising Coca-Cola for the Spanish speaking world.

Abraham Mateo released his own version of the song on January 25, 2017 sung in Spanish.

Lali released a new version of the song in Spanish as part of a Coca-Cola Spain campaign.

On May 4, 2017 Greek band Onirama released a Greek version of the song as part of a Coca-Cola campaign, introducing a new zero-calorie stevia-flavoured product.

K-pop girl group Mamamoo released a new Korean-language version of “Taste the Feeling” on November 9, 2017. It was announced that this version will serve as a theme song for the 2018 Winter Olympics in Pyeongchang.

Coca-Cola is paying tribute to its local heritage in Belarus with the release of local language version of the "Taste the Feeling" by Belerusian Indi Pop duo NaviBand on June 25, 2017.

References 

2016 singles
2016 songs
Avicii songs
Conrad Sewell songs
Song recordings produced by Avicii